Miss Navajo Nation is a pageant that has been held annually on the Navajo Nation, United States, since 1952.

The first Miss Navajo was Beulah Melvin Allen, in 1952. She was crowned at the Navajo Nation Fair, the largest fair held on the Navajo Nation, which had been established three years earlier.

Pageant contestants must be unmarried, over 18 years of age, be a high school graduate, and be able to speak the Navajo language. They compete in such activities as answering questions about traditional and modern Navajo customs both in Navajo and English, sheep butchering, and performing a contemporary and Navajo cultural talent.

The current Miss Navajo Nation (2022-2023) is Valentina Clitso.

Film
A documentary film called Miss Navajo, directed by Billy Luther (who is Navajo, Hopi, and Laguna), was filmed in 2005 and 2006, released in 2006, and shown on the Independent Lens documentary series on PBS in 2007. Miss Navajo is a tradition that still continues today. Miss Navajo's duties as a leader are to guide and be a role model of the Navajo Nation.

Mission Statement
The mission statement of Miss Navajo Nation is:

"In keeping with Navajo culture and tradition, the role of Miss Navajo Nation is to exemplify the essence and characters of First Woman, White Shell Woman and Changing Woman and to display leadership as the Goodwill Ambassador. Miss Navajo Nation represents womanhood and fulfills the role of 'grandmother, mother, aunt, and sister' to the Navajo people; therefore she can speak as a leader, teacher, counselor, advisor and friend. In March 1999, the Branch Chiefs of the Navajo government agreed that tone of the fundamental principals of the Navajo government should be the preservation of the Navajo culture. It shall be the mission of the Office of Miss Navajo Nation to encourage every Navajo to assist in the preservation of Navajo culture and Miss Navajo Nation will represent the importance of Navajo women with respect and honor."

Miss Navajo Nation Title Holders

External links
Office of Miss Navajo Nation
Miss Navajo Council, Inc official site
Miss Navajo film
MISS NAVAJO site for Independent Lens on PBS

References

Native American women
Navajo history
Navajo Nation government
Recurring events established in 1952
Award ceremonies in the United States
Women in Arizona
Women in Utah
Women in New Mexico